Kalyan Raj Gautam, better known as Dear Kalyan, is a Nepalese storyteller and radio jockey. His show Mero Katha was one of the most popular radio programs in Nepal during the late 1990s and 2000s. It is also one of Nepal's longest-running radio programs, having been broadcast since 1996.

Gautam has also written the novel Radio Chhaap Salai, which was published in 2012.

Personal life 
Kalyan Raj Gautam married one of his fans, Sanjana Giri, in early 2002. They have two children, a daughter, and a son. His first child (his daughter) was diagnosed with autism when she was fifteen months old. He immigrated to the United States in 2010, and his family joined him in the States six or seven years later. He continued to broadcast his show even after moving to the States, which has been broadcast for more than twenty-four years now. It is currently broadcast on Image FM 97.9 every Thursday and Saturday, and is also uploaded on his YouTube channel.

Career 
Gautam started his career as radio jockey in 1996 on Hits FM with the show named Mero Geet Mero Katha, where he introduced himself as Dear Kalyan to the audience. The concept of the show involved reading real life stories sent to him by his audience. He would read the stories, verify if the story was real; rewrite it if necessary, and then narrate it on his show. The show gained instant recognition, since the concept was different from the other radio programs at the time. It was later renamed Mero Katha. From 1996 to the next few years, Gautam received over 300 letters per week from his audience, who wanted him to present their stories in his show. The show went on to become one of the longest running radio programs in Nepal.

References

External links 

 Kalyan Gautam on YouTube

Living people
Nepalese people
Khas people
Year of birth missing (living people)
Nepali radio presenters